Maubin Township is a township of Maubin District in the Ayeyarwady Region of Burma (Myanmar).

Communities
There are 76 village tracts comprising 470 villages in Maubin Township.

Notes

External links
 "Maubin Township, Village Tracts" map created August 2010, Myanmar Information Management Unit (MIMU)
 "Ma-Ubin Google Satellite Map" Maplandia World Gazetteer

Townships of Ayeyarwady Region